Mandiru (also Romanized as Māndīrū; also known as Mandevīr) is a village in Polan Rural District, Polan District, Chabahar County, Sistan and Baluchestan Province, Iran. At the 2006 census, its population was 727, in 149 families.

References 

Populated places in Chabahar County